The 1981 ICF Canoe Sprint World Championships were held in Nottingham, Great Britain.

The men's competition consisted of six Canadian (single paddle, open boat) and nine kayak events. Three events were held for the women, all in kayak.

This was the sixteenth championships in canoe sprint.

Medal summary

Men's

Canoe

Kayak

Women's

Kayak

Medals table

References
ICF medalists for Olympic and World Championships - Part 1: flatwater (now sprint): 1936-2007. 
ICF medalists for Olympic and World Championships - Part 2: rest of flatwater (now sprint) and remaining canoeing disciplines: 1936-2007.

Icf Canoe Sprint World Championships, 1981
Icf Canoe Sprint World Championships, 1981
ICF Canoe Sprint World Championships
Sports competitions in England
Canoeing in England
Canoeing and kayaking competitions in the United Kingdom
International sports competitions hosted by England
Sport in Nottingham
1980s in Nottingham